Vincent Subramaniam (born 28 January 1955) is a Singaporean football coach. Educated at Victoria School, Vincent was most recently in charge of Young Lions.

He was the national coach of the Singapore national football team from 1998 to 2001. He has also managed Indian I-League club Churchill Brothers SC.

Personal life

Vincent was a former staff sergeant with the Singapore Armed Forces.

Honours

Manager
Singapore Armed Forces
S.League: 1997, 1998

Individual
S.League Coach of the Year: 1996, 1997
Asian Coach of the Month: July 1997

References

1955 births
Living people
Singaporean footballers
Singaporean people of Tamil descent
Singaporean sportspeople of Indian descent
Singaporean expatriates in India
Victoria School, Singapore alumni
Singapore national football team managers
I-League managers
Expatriate football managers in India
Churchill Brothers FC Goa managers
Home United FC head coaches
Singaporean football managers
Singapore Premier League head coaches
Warriors FC head coaches
Association footballers not categorized by position